Benjamin "Ben" Hueso (born September 2, 1969) is an American businessman and politician who served in the California State Senate. A Democrat, he represented the 40th Senate District, which encompassed Imperial County and the border regions of San Diego County.

Hueso served as Chair of the California Latino Legislative Caucus. He previously served as Vice-Chair from 2015 to 2016.

Hueso was elected to the State Senate in a 2013 special election to replace then-Senator Juan Vargas, who was elected to the U.S. House of Representatives in November 2012. Before being elected to the State Senate, he served in the California State Assembly, representing the 80th Assembly District from 2012 to 2013 and the 79th Assembly District from 2010 to 2012. Prior to that, he served on the San Diego City Council, including two years as Council President.

Education and career
Hueso was born in San Diego and grew up in Logan Heights. His parents were immigrants from Mexico and community activists, running an informal community medical clinic out of their home. He graduated from Point Loma High School and then from the University of California, Los Angeles with a degree in Sociology/Urban Studies and Planning. He studied at the University of Odessa, Ukraine and completed post-graduate work in Community and Economic Development at San Diego State University. He worked for the city as a redevelopment agency staffer and also owned his own business.

Elective office

San Diego City Council
Hueso was elected in a special 2005 election and reelected in the regular 2006 election to represent San Diego City Council District 8. He was the only Latino on the council at the time. He was chosen by his colleagues to serve as City Council President 2009-2010, the second person to serve in that post. He was also a member of the California Coastal Commission for two years while serving on the City Council.

California State Assembly
He was elected in November 2010 to represent the 79th District in the  California State Assembly of the California State Legislature. In 2012 he was elected to the 80th district due to redistricting.

California State Senate
In January 2013 he declared his candidacy for the State Senate 40th district, which became vacant when State Senator Juan Vargas was elected to Congress. He won the election on March 12, 2013, avoiding a runoff by garnering 52.3% of the vote against three other candidates. He took office on March 21, 2013.

In March 2017 Hueso was the lead author of the controversial California Senate Bill 649 which would have removed a city's ability to control where the 5G cell service antennas are placed, transferring that power to the state

San Diego County Board of Supervisors

On August 18, 2019, Hueso announced that he would be a candidate for the San Diego County Board of Supervisors.  He ran to succeed incumbent Greg Cox, a popular Republican who was term-limited.  In the March 3, 2020 primary, Hueso finished in first place with 29.3% of the vote and faces Southwestern Community College Board Trustee Nora Vargas, who finished second place with 18.9%, in the November runoff.  In a mild upset, Vargas won the runoff.

California State Board of Equalization 
As of 2021, Hueso had opened a campaign account to run for the California State Board of Equalization in 2022.

Personal 
Hueso is a lifelong resident of Logan Heights in San Diego's District 8. He has four sons.

At 2:49 a.m. on Aug 22, 2014, Sen. Hueso was arrested in downtown Sacramento on suspicion of DUI.

References

External links 

Join California Ben Hueso

1969 births
Hispanic and Latino American state legislators in California
Living people
Businesspeople from San Diego
San Diego City Council members
San Diego State University alumni
University of California, Los Angeles alumni
21st-century American politicians
Democratic Party California state senators